Buckcherry is the debut album by the rock band Buckcherry. It was released on April 6, 1999 by DreamWorks Records. "Lit Up", "For the Movies", "Dead Again", and "Check Your Head" were released as singles. As of September 2006, the album has sold in excess of 750,000 copies, and was certified Gold by both the RIAA and Canada, making it DreamWorks' first Gold album. It is the band's only album as a four-piece.

Track listing 
All tracks by Buckcherry
 "Lit Up" – 3:35
 "Crushed" – 3:40
 "Dead Again" – 3:24
 "Check Your Head" – 4:32
 "Dirty Mind" – 5:00
 "For the Movies" – 4:34
 "Lawless and Lulu" – 4:08
 "Related" – 3:28
 "Borderline" – 4:26
 "Get Back" – 3:08
 "Baby" – 4:27
 "Drink the Water" – 4:18
 "Late Nights in Voodoo" (Japan bonus track) - 4:51

Disc 2 
Special Re-Release 21 November 2006 CD
 "Lit Up" (video)
 "For the Movies" (video)
 "Check Your Head" (video)
 "Dead Again" (video)
 "Crushed" (Live) (video)
 "Check Your Head" (Live) (video)
 "For the Movies" (Alternate version) (video)
 "Late Nights in Voodoo"
 "Fastback 69"
 "Lit Up" (Live)

Personnel 
 Josh Todd – Vocals
 Keith Nelson – Guitar
 Jonathan "J.B." Brightman – Bass
 Devon Glenn – Drums, Percussion

Additional Members
 Steve Jones – Guitar, Backing Vocals
 Kim Bullard – Keyboards
 Greg Archilla – Mixing
 David Bianco – Producer, Engineer
 Chris Bilheimer – Art Direction
 Bruce Bouillet – Engineer
 Buckcherry – Producer
 Jason Corsaro – Mixing
 Joseph Cultice – Photography
 Terry Date – Producer, Engineer, Mixing
 Steve Durkee – Programming, Engineer, Assistant Engineer
 Kristin Hambsch – Creative Director
 Ted Jensen – Mastering
 Steve Mixdorf – Assistant Engineer
 Scott Olson – Programming, Engineer
 Cameron Webb – Assistant Engineer, Mixing Assistant
 Ulrich Wild – Programming, Engineer

Charts

Weekly charts

Year-end charts

Certifications

References 

Buckcherry albums
1999 debut albums
DreamWorks Records albums
Albums produced by Terry Date